Tobias Dier (born 29 September 1976) is a German professional golfer.

Dier was born in Nürnberg. He won the 1998 German Amateur Open Championship and turned professional later that year. He won a European Tour card by finishing sixth on the Challenge Tour Order of Merit in 1998. He has two European Tour wins, the 2001 North West of Ireland Open, and the 2002 TNT Dutch Open, including a round of 60 at the Hilversum Golf Club. Since then he struggled for form and dropped back down to the Challenge Tour from 2006.

Amateur wins
1998 German Amateur Open Championship

Professional wins (3)

European Tour wins (2)

1Dual-ranking event with the Challenge Tour

Challenge Tour wins (1)

1Dual-ranking event with the European Tour

Challenge Tour playoff record (0–1)

EPD Tour wins (1)

Results in World Golf Championships

"T" = Tied

Team appearances
Amateur
European Youths' Team Championship (representing Germany): 1996
European Amateur Team Championship (representing Germany): 1997
Eisenhower Trophy (representing Germany): 1996
Bonallack Trophy (representing Europe): 1998 (winners)

References

External links
 

German male golfers
European Tour golfers
Sportspeople from Nuremberg
1976 births
Living people